The battle of Raduša, also known as the battle for Rašče or the battle for the salvation of Rašče was a series of skirmishes and ambushes that started in the middle of July 2001 and ended in a full-scale invasion of the Albanian National Liberation Army (NLA) and Kosovo Protection Corps members from the territory of Kosovo concentrated at the Raduša police checkpoint and Army border outpost near the village of Rašče. This battle took place during the General Ceasefire Agreement and was the worst violation of the treaty with the NLA abusing the demilitarized zones around the border to advance The first incidents began near the end of June and escalated in the middle of August 2001. Despite heavy use of aerial bombardment, the insurgents of the NLA managed to destroy the Army outpost and police station after which the Macedonian police forces were withdrawn to secondary defensive positions.

Background

The battle was part of the wider inter-ethnic conflict known as the Insurgency in the Republic of Macedonia between the Albanian NLA and Macedonian Security Forces concentrated near the border with Kosovo. The brunt of the fighting happened near the village of Raduša and Bojane villages that guard the roads to the Rašče water supply which supplies water to the capital city of Skopje, Raduša is 4.68 miles north of the water spring and Bojane is 3.13 miles to the west. Previously the NLA had cut off the water supply in the Lipkovo dam which provides the city of Kumanovo with water and electricity causing a humanitarian crisis in the city. The NLA had previously also directly attacked the Rašče police station during the ceasefire but the Macedonian security forces did not respond to the provocations.

The use of NATO brokered ceasefires to gain ground from places previously held by Macedonian security forces was a common NLA tactic throughout the war, this was the case in Tetovo after Operation MH which dislodged the rebels from Tetovo and was used in Raduša as well, this was confirmed by NLA commander Petrit Menaj in his conversations with Ali Ahmeti the leader of the NLA nicknamed "Abaz", on 26 July 2001 Petrit received a message from NLA HQ instructing him to use the truce to expand the front and occupy dominant positions. In his book he states: 

In a report for OSCE, Harald Schenker stated:

Battle

Opening skirmishes 

The first clash took place on 20 June 2001, when four policemen from the Raduša police station discovered an NLA camp of forty insurgents on the steps of Žeden mountain, during a patrol of the terrain on the border. The police patrol opened fire killing one insurgent and wounding another. The patrol called on air support which came immediately and pushed the insurgents towards Kosovo.

On 23 July, one of the most dramatic single events in the conflict occurred when another police border patrol was attacked in an NLA ambush near Raduša. The police patrol was led by Aco Stojanovski, the Deputy-Commander of the Raduša police station. The insurgents fired at the police vehicle with RPG rockets, throwing three policemen out of the car and leaving one inside. The NLA attempted to approach the badly wounded policemen. Commander Stojanovski's firing six rounds from an AK-47 at the insurgents saved them until soldiers from the Raduša border post arrived and repelled the NLA with fire from an armored personnel carrier. After the conflict, commander Stojanovski became the president of the Union of Army and Police veterans of the Conflict in Macedonia.

After this ambush there were calls to seriously strengthen the defenses around Raduša in order to prevent the NLA from capturing the water supply near the village of Rasce which would have stopped the water supply to the capital city of Skopje.

Major offensive 

In the early hours of 10 August 2001, the NLA launched an offensive from the area of Krivenik in the Kosovo Municipality of Đeneral Janković (Hani i Elezit), invading the territory of Macedonia in the region of Raduša. The offensive took place during the ceasefire period, only days before the signing of the Ohrid Framework Agreement. The first actions began at 20:00 the same day with a mortar attack on the Raduša police station, located at the entrance of the village. The police station was manned by only thirty-five policemen. The security forces returned fire and the shootout lasted until 2:00 A.M. Afterwards, the NLA initiated an infantry attack which was repelled by the police. During the attack one police officer was injured.

According to information obtained by the Macedonian intelligence service, the attack was conducted by more than six hundred NLA insurgents, supported by volunteers from the Kosovo Protection Corps. The Corps came from the town of Krivenik in Kosovo and crossed the Macedonian border into Raduša during the night. According to the same information, the NLA plan of action was to neutralise the security forces in the Raduša sector, then penetrate southwards and capture the Rašče water spring which feeds the Macedonian capital Skopje with drinking water. Cutting water supplies would create a humanitarian crisis in the city.

The Ministry of Interior single-handedly declared an alert condition and sent detachments of the "Tiger" special police unit to dig in and secure the Rašče spring. Other detachments of the "Tiger" were sent to rescue thirty-five policemen surrounded at the Raduša station. Because of the lack of artillery support, and the overwhelming numbers of the NLA encirclement, they dug–in at positions outside Raduša. The Minister of Interior Ljube Boškoski and Prime Minister Ljubčo Georgievski asked President Trajkovski for an immediate activation of the army in order to neutralise the invasion from Kosovo. The president, however, encouraged by the NATO and EU envoys, was concentrated on reaching a political solution that respected the conditions of the 5 July Ceasefire Agreement. He asked that the police not respond to provocations in order to avoid an escalation of the conflict. Meanwhile, the encircled policemen in the Raduša station were left on their own.

On 11 August, the second day of the battle, the NLA began the most serious attack against the security forces in the Skopje region. A column of two hundred Albanian insurgents attacked the Raduša army border post with mortar, automatic rifle and sniper fire. The Raduša army border post, located between the villages of Kučkovo and Raduša, was manned by twenty-five soldiers with mortars, automatic rifles, one tank, and three armoured personnel carriers. At the same time, the NLA conducted another assault attack on the encircled police station at the Raduša village. The army and police returned fire and, during the heavy fighting, the NLA managed to set fire to the petrol barrels within the barracks of the army border post. The insurgents managed to come so close that they started cutting the wire-fence. The policemen also managed to repel all of the attacks made on 11 August. Western media later showed images a Macedonian T-55 tank captured by the Albanian rebels in Raduša.

Aftermath 

After the signing of the ceasefire Raduša was chosen as one of the designated collection sites for the voluntary disposal of NLA weapons where the 115th Brigade which took part in the battle disposed of its weapons and captured vehicles after the Macedonian security forces previously withdrew from the collection sites as was agreed with NATO, the NLA did not honor its commitment to withdraw to lines held before the 5th July ceasefire.

See also

 Operation Vaksince
 Operation MH-2
 Operation MH

References

Battles in 2001
2001 insurgency in Macedonia
2001 in the Republic of Macedonia
Conflicts in 2001